Ram Bahadur Bista is a Nepalese politician. He was elected to the Pratinidhi Sabha in the 1999 election on behalf of the Nepali Congress. Bista was the Nepali Congress candidate in the Achham-2 constituency for the 2008 Constituent Assembly election.

References

Living people
Nepali Congress politicians from Sudurpashchim Province
Place of birth missing (living people)
Nepal MPs 2017–2022
Nepal MPs 1999–2002
Nepal MPs 1991–1994
1953 births